Acta Palaeontologica Polonica is a quarterly peer-reviewed open access scientific journal of paleontology and paleobiology. It was established by Roman Kozłowski in 1956. It is published by the Institute of Paleobiology of the Polish Academy of Sciences and edited by Richard L. Cifelli and Jarosław Stolarski.

Abstracting and indexing 
Acta Palaeontologica Polonica is abstracted and indexed in:

According to the Journal Citation Reports, the journal has a 2010 impact factor of 1.949, ranking it 11th out of 48 journals in the category "Paleontology".

References

External links

 
 Institute of Paleobiology

Paleontology journals
Publications established in 1956
Polish Academy of Sciences academic journals
Open access journals
English-language journals
Quarterly journals